Syllepis semifuneralis is a moth in the family Crambidae. It was described by Eugene G. Munroe in 1970. It is found in Bolivia and Peru.

References

Moths described in 1970
Spilomelinae